Silongkoyo is a former Maidu village in Plumas County, California. It lay at an elevation of 3435 feet (1047 m). The site now lies within Quincy.

References

Former populated places in California
Former settlements in Plumas County, California
Maidu villages